"I'll Be Your Everything" is a song by American pop music singer Tommy Page that was included on his album Paintings in My Mind. Released as a single in early 1990, "I'll Be Your Everything" reached No. 1 on the US Billboard Hot 100 chart in April 1990. The song spent one week at No. 1, thirteen weeks in the Top 40 and was certified Gold by the RIAA.  "I'll Be Your Everything" also peaked at No. 31 on the Adult Contemporary chart

Background and writing
The song was co-written by Page along with Jordan Knight and Danny Wood of the pop boy band New Kids on the Block. While on tour with the New Kids in 1989, Page was playing piano at a hotel one night when Knight approached him, and the two played piano together for a period of time. Knight played Page a verse from what would become "I'll Be Your Everything", a song that Knight wanted to save for a future solo project. The two later collaborated on finishing the song, and Page asked if he could record it for his next album. Knight agreed and produced the track, and fellow band members Danny Wood and Donnie Wahlberg participated in the project as well.

Music video
The video peaked at number one for several weeks and featured model Robyn Leigh Hadem.

Charts

Weekly charts

Year-end charts

Certifications

References

1990 singles
Billboard Hot 100 number-one singles
Cashbox number-one singles
Songs written by Jordan Knight
Pop ballads
Songs written by Danny Wood
1989 songs
Sire Records singles